KonLive Distribution (or simply KonLive) was a record label founded by R&B singer Akon. The label served as a joint-venture deal between Jimmy Iovine and Interscope Records. Notable artists briefly signed to the label include Lady Gaga, Kardinal Offishall, Colby O'Donis, Brick & Lace, Mali Music, Natalia Kills, Jeffree Star and R. City.

Artists 
 Redd Hott
 Dylan Dilinjah
 Zewdy

Former artists
 Lady Gaga
 Kardinal Offishall
 Ya Boy
 Brick & Lace
 Natalia Kills
 Jeffree Star
 Colby O'Donis
 Mali Music

Discography

References

American record labels
Record labels established in 2006
Contemporary R&B record labels
Hip hop record labels
Vanity record labels
Labels distributed by Universal Music Group
Akon

vi:Kon Live Distribution